The 2008 IIHF World U18 Championship Division III were a pair of international under-18 ice hockey tournaments run by the International Ice Hockey Federation. The Division III tournaments made up the fourth level of competition at the 2008 IIHF World U18 Championships. The Group A tournament took place between 2 and 8 March 2008 in Mexico City, Mexico and the Group B tournament took place between 3 and 9 March 2008 in İzmit, Turkey. Mexico and Serbia won the Group A and Group B tournaments respectively and gained promotion to Division II for the 2009 IIHF World U18 Championships.

Group A tournament
The Group A tournament began on 2 March 2008 in Mexico City, Mexico at the San Jeronimo Arena. New Zealand and South Africa both returned to compete in the Division III competition after missing promotion at the previous years World Championships. Mexico entered the Division II competition after being relegated from the 2007 Division II Group A tournament. Chinese Taipei and Mongolia returned to international competition, having last played in the 2002 IIHF Asian Oceanic U18 Championship.

Mexico finished first after winning all four of their games and gamed promotion back to Division II for the 2009 IIHF World U18 Championships. Chinese Taipei finished second after losing only to Mexico and New Zealand finished in third place. Christopher Eaden of New Zealand led the tournament in scoring with 18 points and was named the top forward by the IIHF directorate. Mexico's Manuel Escandon was named the top defenceman and Lin Tsung-Han of Chinese Taipei was selected as the top goaltender. Mexico's Agustin Grimaldi was the leading goaltender with a save percentage of 0.938.

During the first day of the tournament the game between Mexico and South Africa was suspended and the tournament postponed due to a faulty ventilation system which was causing the people within the arena to fall ill. At the time the game was suspended Mexico was winning 11–0, however the IIHF declared the game forfeit in favour of Mexico. The tournament was resumed three days later with equipment being provided to monitor blood oxygen levels and the heart rate of players.

Standings

Fixtures
All times local.

Scoring leaders
List shows the top ten ranked skaters sorted by points, then goals.

Leading goaltenders
Only the top five goaltenders, based on save percentage, who have played at least 40% of their team's minutes are included in this list.

Group B tournament
The Group B tournament began on 3 March 2008 in İzmit, Turkey at the K.B.B. Ice Arena. Iceland and Turkey returned to compete in the Division III tournament after missing promotion to Division II at the previous years World Championships. Serbia entered the Division II competition after being relegated from the 2007 Division II Group B tournament. Bulgaria returned to Division III after playing in the qualification tournament last year and Armenia returned to international competition, having last played in the 2005 IIHF World U18 Championship Division III Qualification tournament.

Serbia finished first after winning all four of their games and gained promotion back to Division II for the 2009 IIHF World U18 Championships. Iceland finished second, losing only to Serbia and Turkey finished in third place. Arsenije Rankovic of Serbia led the tournament in goaltending with a save percentage of 1.000 and was named the top goaltender by the IIHF directorate. Serbia's Stefan Ilic was named the top defenceman and Egill Thormodsson of Iceland was selected as the top forward. Thormodsson also led the tournament in scoring, finishing with 18 points including 16 goals and two assists.

Standings

Fixtures
All times local.

Scoring leaders
List shows the top ten ranked skaters sorted by points, then goals.

Leading goaltenders
Only the top five goaltenders, based on save percentage, who have played at least 40% of their team's minutes are included in this list.

See also
2008 IIHF World U18 Championships
2008 IIHF World U18 Championship Division I
2008 IIHF World U18 Championship Division II

Notes
 I The Game was suspended midway through the second period due to the Arena's faulty ventilation system which was causing people to become ill. At the time the game was suspended Mexico was winning 11–0.

References

IIHF World U18 Championship Division III
III
International ice hockey competitions hosted by Mexico
International ice hockey competitions hosted by Turkey
Youth ice hockey in Turkey
Sport in İzmit
IIHF World U18 Championship Division III
World
2007 in Mexican sports